Namsang is a tehsil in the Indian state of Arunachal Pradesh. It is in the Tirap district of India.

See also
List of constituencies of Arunachal Pradesh Legislative Assembly
Arunachal Pradesh Legislative Assembly

References

Villages in Tirap district